Khiron Oonchaiyaphum (born 21 November 1999) is a Thai professional footballer who plays as a centre back for Thai League 2 club Trat, on loan from Buriram United.

Personal life
He was named after Kieron Dyer due to their similarity in looks.

References

External links
Khiron Oonchaiyaphum at livesoccer888

Khiron Oonchaiyaphum
1999 births
Living people
Khiron Oonchaiyaphum
Association football defenders
Khiron Oonchaiyaphum
Khiron Oonchaiyaphum